The Darod is a Somali clan. The forefather of this clan was Sheikh Abdirahman bin Isma'il al-Jabarti, more commonly known as Darood. The clan primarily settles the apex of the Horn of Africa and its peripheries, the Somali hinterlands up to Oromia, and both sides of the Kenya-Somalia border.

The Darod clan is the largest Somali clan family in the Horn of Africa.

Origins 

According to early Islamic books and Somali tradition, Aqeel Abu Talib ibn Abd al-Muttalib Al-Qurashi descendant Abdirahman bin Isma'il al-Jabarti (Darod), a son of the Sufi Sheikh Isma'il al-Jabarti of the Qadiriyyah order, fled his homeland in the Arabian Peninsula after an argument with his uncle. During the 10th or 11th century CE, Abdirahman is believed to have then settled in Somaliland just across the Red Sea and married Dobira, the daughter of the Dir clan chief. This union is said to have given rise to the Darod clan family. Thus, it established matrilateral ties with the Samaale main stem.

According to the British anthropologist and Somali Studies veteran Ioan Lewis, the traditions of descent from noble Arab families related to the Prophet are most probably figurative expressions of the importance of Islam in Somali society. However, "there is a strong historically valid component in these legends which, in the case of the Darod, is confirmed in the current practice of a Dir representative officiating at the ceremony of installation of the chief of the Darod family."

A similar clan mythology exists for the Sheikh Ishaq ibn Ahmad al-'Alawi, who are said to have descended from one Sheikh Ishaq ibn Ahmad al-'Alawi, another Banu Hashim who came to Somaliland around the same time. As with Sheikh Isaaq, there are also numerous existing hagiologies in Arabic which describe Sheikh Darod's travels, works and overall life in northern Somalia, as well as his movements in Arabia before his arrival. Besides historical sources such as Al-Masudi's Aqeeliyoon, a modern manaaqib (a collection of glorious deeds) printed in Cairo in 1945 by Sheikh Ahmad bin Hussen bin Mahammad titled Manaaqib as-Sheikh Ismaa'iil bin Ibraahiim al-Jabarti also discusses Sheikh Darod and his proposed father Isma'il al-Jabarti, the latter of whom is reportedly buried in Bab Siham in the Zabid District of western Yemen.

Sheikh Darod's own tomb is in Haylaan, situated in the Sanaag region of Somaliland, and is the scene of frequent pilgrimages. Sheikh Isaaq is buried nearby in Maydh, as is Sheikh Harti, a descendant of Sheikh Darod and the progenitor of the Harti Darod sub-clan, whose tomb lies in the ancient town of Qa’ableh.

Sheikh Darod's mawlid (birthday) is also celebrated every Friday with a public reading of his manaaqib.

The Darod were supporters of Imam Ahmad ibn Ibrahim al-Ghazi during his 16th century conquest of Abyssinia; especially the Harti, Marehan and Bartire sub-clans, who fought at Shimbra Kure, among other battles. In his medieval Futuh Al-Habash documenting this campaign, the chronicler Shihāb al-Dīn indicates that 300 Harti soldiers took part in Imam Ahmad's Adal Sultanate army. He describes them as "famous among the infantry as stolid swordsmen" and "a people not given to yielding".

Lineage 

Darod is believed to be the son of the famous Arabian Sheikh, Ismail bin Ibrahim Al-Jabarti, who is buried in the Zabid District of Yemen who  is believed to have descendant of Aqeel ibn Abi Talib who in turn hails from the Quraysh, a historically significant Arab tribe that the final prophet of Islam, Muhammed hails from.
In 2009, former President of Somalia, Abdullahi Yusuf visited the grave of Ismail bin Ibrahim Al-Jabarti in Yemen

According to many medieval and modern Islamic historians, Darod is descended from Aqeel ibn Abi Talib, the cousin of Muhammad and brother of Ali ibn Abi Talib. An ancient Islamic history book, called Aqeeliyoon by Al-Masudi, talks in detail about the descendants of Aqeel ibn Abi Talib, wherein Darod is also mentioned. The book gives Sheikh Darod's lineage as Abdirahmaan Bin Ismaa'iil Bin Ibraahim Bin Abdirahmaan Bin Muhammed Bin Abdi Samad Bin Hanbal Bin Mahdi Bin Ahmed Bin Abdalle Bin Muhammed Bin Aqail Bin Abu-Talib Bin Abdul-Mutalib Bin Hashim Bin Qusaya.

According to Allaa'i Alsuniyah Fi Al-Aqab Al-Aqeeliyah (2006) by Ahmed bin Ali Al-Rajihi Al-Aqeeli, the lineage of Sheikh Darod/Da'ud is: "Da'ud ibn Ismail ibn Ibrahim ibn Abdulsamad ibn Ahmed ibn Abdallah ibn Ahmed Ibn Ismail ibn Ibrahim ibn Abdallah ibn Isma'il ibn Ali ibn Abdallah ibn Muhammad ibn Hamid ibn Abdallah ibn Ibrahim ibn Ali ibn Ahmed ibn Abdallah ibn Muslim ibn Abdallah ibn Muhammad ibn Aqeel ibn Abi-Talib Al-Hashimi Al-Qurashi". Al-Aqeeli adds that Sheikh Isma'il's sons include Abi-Bakar, Da'ud, Ahmad and Abdulsamad, whose other offspring inhabit the Hadhramaut and Mahra regions in Southern Arabia.

Distribution
 
The Darood are believed to be a large Somali clan both in terms of population size and land inhabitation. The Darood constitute a big presence in the Somali Region of Ethiopia and are also the one of the largest Somali clan in North Eastern Province of Kenya. Within Somalia, the Darood are also one of the largest clans, with traditional strongholds in the north, modern day Puntland state which is dominated by the Harti subclan of Darood. In addition, the Marehan, Ogaden, Jidwaaq, and Harti Darod members are also settled further down south in the Gedo region as well as the Middle Jubba and Lower Jubba regions of Somalia. The Darood in Somalia, roughly corresponds to the Darood's settled within the Jubbaland and Puntland states. In Somaliland the Darood settle the eastern Sool, Sanaag regions and the Buhoodle district of Togdheer

Major Darood Settlements within Somalia include Galkacyo, Kismaayo, Bosaso, and Garowe.

Darood are also the largest clan in Jigjiga in Ethiopia, and Garissa in Northern Kenya.

Nobility 

The Darod clan has produced numerous noble Somali men and women over the centuries, including many Sultans. Traditionally, the Darod population was mostly concentrated in the northern and northeastern cities on the Gulf of Aden and upper Indian Ocean coast in the Horn of Africa. Darod noble men ruled these settlement pockets until the European colonial powers changed the political dynamics of Somalia during the late 19th century. Before many Darods began pushing southward in the mid-1850s, the Majeerteen Sultanate and Sultanate of Hobyo held steadfast in solidly established posts from Alula to Hobyo.

Clan tree 
There is no clear agreement on the clan and sub-clan structures and many lineages are omitted. The following listing is based upon the World Bank's Conflict in Somalia: Drivers and Dynamics from 2005 and the United Kingdom's Home Office publication, Somalia Assessment 2001.

Darod (Daarood)
Geri Koombe
Harla
Sade 
(Marehan)
Reer Dini
Reer Hassan
Eli Dheere
Tenade
 Leelkaase
Yusuf
Awrtable
Kabalah
Absame
Ogaden
Makabul
Mohamed Zubeir
Aulihan
Jidwaaq
Bartire
Abaskuul
Yabare
Harti
Dishiishe (Dishishe)
Warsangali (Warsengeli)
Majeerteen (Mijerteen)
Reer Biciidyahaan
Siwaaqroon
Ali jibrahiil 
Ali Saleeban 
ugaar saleeban 
Mahamoud Saleeban
Omar Mahmud
Issa Mahmud
Osman Mahmoud
Dhulbahante (Dolbahante) 
Mohamud Garaad
Jama Siad
Galool Oriye
Farah Garaad
Baharsame
Barkad 
Ararsame
Bah Ali Gheri
Abdi Garaad
Khayr Abdi
 Omar Abdi
In the south central part of Somalia the World Bank shows the following clan tree:

Darood
Kablalah
Kombe
Kumade
Isse
Sade
Marehan
Facaye
Awrtable
Leelkase (Lelkase)

One tradition maintains that Darod had one daughter .

Darod's tomb 
Darod is buried in an old town called Haylaan near Badhan in the north-eastern Sanaag region of Somalia. His wife Dobira is buried just outside the town. The surrounding buildings and the mosque near the tomb was built by the former president of Somalia Abdullahi Yusuf.

Darod is believed to be the son of the famous Arabian Sheikh, Ismail bin Ibrahim Al-Jabarti, who is buried in the Zabid District of Yemen. Tradition holds that he is descended from the Banu Hashim.

In 2009, former President of Somalia, Abdullahi Yusuf visited the grave of Ismail bin Ibrahim Al-Jabarti in Yemen

Sheikh Darod's mawlid (birthday) is celebrated every Friday with a public reading of his manaqib and passages in the Quran.

Sons of Sheikh Darod Ismail
Ahmed bin Abdirahman: Sade Darood
Muhammad bin Abdirahman: Kablalax Darood
Hussien bin Abdirahman: Tanade Darod
Yousuf bin Abdirahman: Awrtable Darood
Eissa bin Abdirahman: Cisse Darood

Notable Darod people

Royalty
Ali Yusuf Kenadid, Majerteen, Last Sultan of the Sultanate of Hobyo
Mohamoud Ali Shire, Warsangeli, Sultan of former "British Somaliland" (1897–1960)
Ugas Yasin Ugas Abdurahman former ruler of Bosaso
Xasan Deyl, chief caaqil of Bah Cali Gheri during independence
Garaad Abdulahi Garaad Soofe, first chief caaqil of Bah Cali Gheri in 21st century
Yuusuf Kooreeye, chief caaqil of Ararsame during and prior to independence
Omar Amey, the chief caaqil of Ararsame during colonialism
Garaad Kulmiye Garad Mohammed Garad Dool Garaad Wiil Waal, the current chief of Absame, Jidwaaq, and Bartire.

Rulers 
Garaad Wiil-Waal Liberated Jigjiga from the Oromo invaders in the 1700s
Mohammed Abdullah Hassan, Ogaden, the Sayyid / Mad Mullah; religious and nationalist leader of the Dervish movement;
Nur ibn Mujahid, Marehan, second Conqueror of Ethiopia and the Patron Saint of Harar was one of rulers of parts of the Horn of Africa.
Siad Barre, Marehan, third President of Somalia, 1969–1991, Leader of the most successful part of Somalia's history

Inventors and founders 
Osman Yusuf Kenadid, Majerteen, Inventor of the Osmanya Script.
Shire Jama Ahmed, Marehan, inventor of the Somali script
Haji Bashir Ismail Yusuf, Majeerteen, first President of Somali National Assembly; former Minister of Health and Labor of Somalia (1966–67)

Lawyers and legislators 
Ahmed Sheikh Ali Ahmed, Marehan former President of Court of Appeal, Somali Democratic Republic.
Ahmed Hussen, Majeerteen, Minister of Immigration of Canada
Abdulqawi Yusuf, Majerteen, prominent Somali international lawyer and president on the International Court of Justice.
Ilhan Omar, Majerteen, Member of the Minnesota House of Representatives
Mohamud Ali Magan, Marehan, Somali Foreign Affairs, Consul General to United States Of America and Canada
Amina Mohamed, Dhulbahante, former Chairman of the International Organization for Migration and the World Trade Organisation's General Council
Yusuf Mohamed Ismail, Majeerteen, former Ambassador of Somalia to the United Nations Human Rights Office in Geneva

Writers and musicians
Aadan Carab, Dhulbahante, poet who narrated the Dhulbahante genocide at the hands of European colonialists in the Darawiish era
Abdulkadir Hersi Siyad Yamyam, Marehan, was a Somali poet and playwright.
Ahmed Farah Ali Idaaja, Marehan, one of the first Somali language writers and "father" of the Somali written folklore
Nuruddin Farah, Ogaden, World-famous Somali novelist
Ahmed Rasta, Marehan, singer. nicknamed Boqorka Codka (King of Voice.)
Aar Maanta, Ogaden, Somali-British singer-songwriter, actor, composer, instrumentalist and music producer.
 Ahmed Biif, Dishiishe, former singer whom turned into a preacher 
Mohamed Nuur Giriig, Warsangeli, Classical Singer. (1935 - 2002)
Saado Ali Warsame, Dhulbahante, singer-songwriter and former MP in the Federal Parliament of Somalia
Faarax Maxamed Jaamac Cawl, Warsangeli, writer
Careys Ciise Kaarshe, Awrtable, poet.

Military leaders and personnel
Faarax Qarshe, Darawiish governor of Bah Udgoon
General Sulub Ahmed Firin, Abaskuul Jidwaaq Absame, Somalia Chief Police Commander 
Adan Ali Gurey, Dhulbahante, commander of Golaweyne
Suleiman Aden Galaydh, Dhulbahante Darawiish commander at Cagaarweyne
Haji Yusuf Barre, Dhulbahante, commander of the biggest battle in Darawiish history, i.e. Jidbali; made the last stand at Taleh
Yusuf Agararan, Dhulbahante, led most successful Darawiish raid since Dul Madoba
Ibraahin Xoorane, Dhulbahante, Darawiish commander who killed Richard Corfield
Axmed Aarey, Dhulbahante, Darawiish artillery commander who abetted Richard Corfield's death
Afqarshe Ismail, Dhulbahante, former Darawiish spokesman-poet; first person to die in an airstrike in Africa
Nur Hedik, Dhulbahante, commander of the Dooxato (Darawiish cavalry) who had a Shiikhyaale regiment named after him
Abdulkadir Sheikh Dini, Marehan, Former minister of defence of Somalia
Abdullahi Anod, Marehan, Former Head Commander of Somali Military Forces
Mohammed Said Hersi Morgan, Majeerteen, Defense Minister Under The Siad Barre Government
Yusuf Osman Dhumal, Marehan, Former Head Commander of Somali Military Forces
Abdirizak Haji Hussein, Majeerteen, former Prime Minister of Somalia, and former Secretary General of the Somali Youth League.
Barre Adan Shire Hiiraale, Marehan, Former minister of defence of Somalia, Head Jubba Valley Alliance
Jama Ali Korshel, Warsangeli, Somali Army General, former Head of Somali Police and one of the leaders of 1969 coup d'état of Somalia
Ahmed Warsame, Marehan, Head of the Somali Military Academy.
Abdullahi Ahmed Jama, Warsangeli, Former Minister of Justice and 1977 Ogaden War Veteran
Mohamed Abshir Muse, Majerteen, First Commander of the Somali Police Force
Bashir Abdi Mohammed "Ameeriko", Majerteen, current Somali federal government police force commander 
General Mohamed Hussien Daa'ud "Xiirane", Awrtable, a High Commanding General in the Ogaden War

Politicians
Mohamed Abdullahi Mohamed (Farmajo), Marehan, Current President of Somalia
Abdullahi Yusuf Ahmed, Majeerteen, former President of Somalia, First President and founding father of Puntland
Abdirahman Omar Mohamed (Dr. Cunaaye), Awrtable, was the Former Director of Benaadir Regional Medical, Public Health, and Epidemiology Services
Abdi Farah Shirdon, Marehan, former Prime Minister of Somalia
Hirsi Bulhan Farah Majeerteen, former Minister in the civilian government of the 1960s, political prisoner and Pan-Somalist.
Aden Ibrahim Aw Hirsi, Marehan, Author, Politician - Former minister of planning of  Jubaland state of Somalia.
Abdirashid Shermarke, Majeerteen, second President of Somalia, 1967–1969
Mohamed Aden Sheikh, Marean premier Somali intellectual and former head of Somali Technological Development, Minister of Information, Minister of Education, Head of the Ideology Bureau SRRC
Omar Haji Massale, Marehan, Former minister of defence of Somalia
Abdiweli Gaas, Majeerteen Current President of Puntland
Abdi Shire Warsame, Marehan, former Somali Ambassador to Kenya and China and Former Foreign Affairs State minister in Transitional National Government
Ahmed Mohamed Islam(Axmed Madoobe), Ogaden, President of Jubbaland State of Somalia
Abdiwahid Gonjeh, Marehan, Former Prime minister of Somalia, member of upper house
Ahmed Elmi Osman (Karaash), Dhulbahante, Minister of Interior of Puntland and former President of Khatumo State
Fatimo Isaak Bihi, Marehan, first Somali female ambassador, Ambassador to Geneva, Director of the African Department of the Ministry of Foreign Affairs
Abdiasis Nur Hersi, Awrtable,  the former Minister of Labor and Sports from 1970 to 1977
Abdi Mohamoud Omar, Ogaden, President of Somali region of Ethiopia
Mohamed Abdi Yusuf, Awrtable, Former Prime Minister of Somalia
Abdulahi Sheik Ismael Fara-Tag, Member of sen of upper house
Abdihakim Abdullahi Haji Omar, Dhulbahante, Vice President of Puntland
Ahmed Mohamed Hassan, Marehan, Member of the Pan-African Parliament from Djibouti
Abdirahman Farole, Majeerteen, Former President of Puntland
Abdirizak Haji Hussein, Majeerteen, former Prime Minister of Somalia, and former Secretary General of the Somali Youth League.
Abdirizak Jurile, Dishiishe, Veteran politician, Diplomat & Professor. Former TFG minister of planning & International Cooperation, Former MP, former executive director of numerous UN and International organisations, Senator
Abdiweli Sheikh Ahmed, Marehan, Former Prime Minister of Somalia
Omar Sharmarke, Majeerteen, Prime Minister of Somalia, and son of Abdirashid Ali Shermarke
Abdulkadir Abdi Hashi, Leelkase, State Minister of the Presidency for Planning and International Relations of Puntland
Farah Ali Jama, Majeerteen, former Minister of Finance of Puntland
Abdulahi Bille Nour, Dishiishe, Somali State Minister of Education, Cultural & Higher Education, One of Somali longest serving national MPs.
Abdulrahman Jama Barre, Marehan, former Foreign Minister of Somalia and close relative of Siad Barre
Shukran Hussein Gure, Ogaden, MP for Garissa County
Jabir Mohamed Abdi is the current State Minister of Education of the Federal Government of Somalia
Said Mohamed Rage, Dishiishe, Founder of Puntland Counter-piracy Agency and Puntland Minister of Ports, Marine Transportation and Marine Resource 
Farah Maalim, Ogaden, Deputy Speaker in the Parliament of Kenya
Cabbaas Xuseen, Dhulbahante, first prime minister of the Darawiish (1895 - 1900)
Xaashi Suni Fooyaan, Dhulbahante, peace-time prime minister of the Darawiish (1905-1906)

Engineers
Asli Hassan Abade, Ogaden, First Ever African Female Military Pilot
Ali Matan Hashi, Marehan, first Somali pilot, commander of Somali Airforce 1959–1978, Minister of Justice, Minister of Health, Somali Nationalist.
Ali Meggar, Darawiish naval commander

Athletes
Abdi Bile, Dhulbahante, former middle-distance runner and 1500m world champion in 1987.

Other
Iman (model), Majeerteen, a supermodel, actress and entrepreneur
Fatima Jibrell, Dhulbahante, Somali-American environmentalist 
Hirsi Magan Isse, Majeerteen, scholar and one of the leaders of the Somalian revolution
Nathif Jama Adam, Ogaden, Governor of Garissa County and former Head of the Sharjah Islamic Bank's Investments & International Banking Division
Abdirahman Nur Hersi, Awrtable, The former Minister of Finance in Somalia and founding member and executive Vice President of the Islamic Development Bank

Notes

References 
Hunt, John A. (1951). "Chapter IX: Tribes and Their Stock". A General Survey of the Somaliland Protectorate 1944–1950. London: Crown Agent for the Colonies. Accessed  on October 7, 2005 (from Civic Webs Virtual Library archive).
Lewis, I.M. (1955). Peoples of the Horn of Africa: Somali, Afar, and Saho, Part 1, London: International African Institute.
Lewis, I. M. (1961). A pastoral democracy: a study of pastoralism and politics among the Northern Somali of the Horn of Africa, reed. Münster: LIT Verlag, 1999.

Further reading

External links 
The Historic Manuscripts of Abdirahman bin Ismail Al-Jabarti (Da'ud/Darod)

 
Somali clans
Somali clans in Ethiopia